The name Heather has been used for three tropical cyclones in the Eastern Pacific Ocean.
 Tropical Storm Heather (1969)
 Tropical Storm Heather (1973)
 Hurricane Heather (1977)
The name Heather has also been used for one cyclone in the Australian region.
 Tropical Cyclone Harriet–Heather (1992)

Pacific hurricane set index articles